Dangerous Minds is an American drama television series that aired on ABC from September 30, 1996 to March 15, 1997. The series is based on the film of the same name. Annie Potts stars in the lead role originated by Michelle Pfeiffer.

Cast
 Annie Potts as LouAnne Johnson
 Stanley Anderson as Bud Bartkus
 Jenny Gago as Amanda Bardoles
 Michael Jace as Jerome Griffin
 Tamala Jones as Callie Timmons
 Vicellous Reon Shannon as Cornelious Hawkins
 Cedrik Terrell as James Revill
 Maria Costa as Blanca Guerrero
 LaToya Howlett as Alvina Edwards
 Greg Serano as Gusmaro Lopez

Plot
Based on a real person and on the movie of the same name, Marine veteran Louanne Johnson is an unconventional teacher who inspires her class of bright but "difficult" inner-city students, and makes a real difference in their lives, outside school as well as inside.

Episodes

References

External links 
 

1990s American high school television series
1990s American workplace drama television series
1996 American television series debuts
1997 American television series endings
American Broadcasting Company original programming
Live action television shows based on films
Television series about educators
Television series based on adaptations
Television series by ABC Studios
Television shows based on biographies
Television shows set in California